Renda may refer to:

 Renda Broadcasting, Pittsburgh-based radio broadcasting company
 Renda, Latvia, town in Latvia
 Renda Parish, parish in Latvia
 Renmin University of China, known as Renda, a university in Beijing, China
 MT Renda, a Russian tanker that was used to supply fuel to Nome, Alaska, in 2012
 Cyrtostachys renda, palm
 Renda (beetle), a genus of rove beetle in family Staphylinidae

People with the surname
 Giuseppe Renda (1772–1805), Italian painter
 Paolo Renda (1939–2010), Italian-Canadian mobster
 Sara Renda, Italian ballet dancer
 Francesco Renda (1922–2013), Italian mixed martial artist
 Cello Renda, English boxer
 Abdülhalik Renda (1881–1957), Turkish civil servant and politician
 Cenk Renda (born 1969), Turkish basketball player
 Günsel Renda, Turkish historian
 Tony Renda (born 1991), American baseball player
 Thomas A. Renda, American politician
 Hercules Renda, American football player
 Li Renda, Chinese warlord

Italian-language surnames
Turkish-language surnames